Alexandr Lvovic Apukhtin (4 November 1822 – 2 November 1903 in Saint Petersburg) was a Russian Empire government official, and the superintendent of Congress Poland.

Career 
Following the January uprising in Congress Poland, a number of punitive actions were taken by the tsarist government as a measure to quell potential dissent. This included abolishing its autonomy, as well as the liquidation of Bank of Poland. The period was marked by vehement russification to which Apukthin considerably contributed by his alterations to the Polish educational system. His goal was to eradicate the Polish culture by substituting the Polish language with Russian. The reforms proved to be of pernicious nature, as illiteracy soared. In juxtaposition to Poles living in Galicia and Grand Duchy of Posen, Poles from Russia were least educated.

References

1822 births
1903 deaths
Politicians of the Russian Empire
19th-century people from the Russian Empire
20th-century Russian people